Rodica Doehnert (born 1960) is a German screenwriter.

Life 
Doehnert was born in Bucharest and studied at the College of Film and Television in Potsdam-Babelsberg. After graduation, she worked as a director and author for several years. Since 1996, she has mainly written books. She received the Robert Geisendörfer Prize for all the books for Florian: Love from the Heart, and The Dragons. To the successful TV films  and Das Sacher she contributed to the screenplay.

Selected filmography 
 1995: Polizeiruf 110: Im Netz – Director: Rodica Doehnert
 1999: Florian – Liebe aus ganzem Herzen – Director: Dominique Othenin-Girard
 2000: Als uns Flügel wuchsen – Director: Donald Krämer
 2001: Ich kämpfe, solange du lebst – Director: Donald Krämer
 2002: Meine Tochter ist keine Mörderin – Director: Sherry Hormann
 2003: Raus ins Leben – Director: Vivian Naefe
 2004: Meine Tochter – mein Leben – Director: Bodo Fürneisen
 2005: Polizeiruf 110: Schneewittchen – Director: Christiane Balthasar
 2006: Die Pferdeinsel – Director: Josh Broecker
 2006: Das Glück am anderen Ende der Welt – Director: Dietmar Klein
 2006:  – Director: Franziska Meyer-Price
 2007: Prager Botschaft – Director: Lutz Konermann 
 2008: Die Drachen besiegen – Director: Franziska Buch
 2010: Am Kreuzweg – Director: Uwe Janson
 2013:  (TV miniseries) – Director: Uli Edel
 2014: Die Familiendetektivin (TV series, 9 episodes) – Director: Ulli Baumann
 2016: Das Sacher – Director: Robert Dornhelm
 2017: Ein Schnupfen hätte auch gereicht – Director: Christine Hartmann

Publications 
 2016: Das Sacher: Die Geschichte einer Verführung, Roman zum Film, Europa Verlag, München 2016,

External links 
 
 Website von Rodica Doehnert
 Doehnert at filmstoffentwicklung.de

References 

German screenwriters
German television directors
Film people from Bucharest
1960 births
Living people